The St. Albert Comets are a junior C ice hockey team in the Noralta Junior Hockey League (NJHL) based out of St. Albert, Alberta. They play their home games at Servus Credit Union Place.

History 
The St. Albert Comets began life in the spring of 1992 from players wanting to continue their career and play past the U18 level but do not have the time commitment or the physical demands for Junior "A" or "B". The first season of the comets franchise (1992 - 1993) season combined of only St. Albert and Sherwood Park in a mini league. A few years later in the 1995 - 1996 season three new teams were added including Edmonton, Thorhild, and Drayton valley. In the same season St. Albert hosted the four league provincials. In the 1996 - 1997 season the Shooters joined the current league they play in today the Noralta Junior Hockey League which had other teams including Calahoo, Morinville, Fort Saskatchewan, Beaumont, and Legal. In the 1996 season they changed their name to St. Albert Mustangs with only 4 Years later in the 2000 season they changed their name to St.Albert Blues to later be renamed in 2012 to what they are known as now the St.Albert Comets

Name timeline 
 1993 - 1996: St. Albert Shooters
 1997 - 1999: St. Albert Mustangs
 2000 - 2002: St. Albert Bruins
 2003 - 2012: St. Albert Blues
 2013–Present: St. Albert Comets

Roster

|}

References

External links
https://stalbertcomets.ca/

Sources 
 http://njhl.hockeyshift.com/history

Ice hockey teams in Alberta
1993 establishments in Alberta
Sport in St. Albert, Alberta